State Route 191 (SR 191) is a  state highway in the US state of Maine. Its southern terminus at SR 189 in Lubec to U.S. Route 1 (US 1) and SR 9 in Baring Plantation. The route offers a bypass of the city of Calais and access to the Cutler Naval Station in Cutler. The entire route is in Washington County.

Route description
The road begins at SR 189 in Lubec. The route heads south, then west, passing near Haycock Harbor, Moose Cove, Sandy Cove, and Money Cove along Machias Bay. SR 191 then enters Cutler, providing a ferry to Machias Seal Island and passes by the Cutler Naval Station. Entering the town of Machias, SR 191 turns north and runs along the Machias River to US 1 where it runs southwest concurrently with it. After  concurrent with US 1, SR 191 branches off and heads to the northeast. It then crosses a river flowing into the Hadley Lake. In Cathance Township (formerly Plantation No. 14), SR 191 meets SR 86. This is SR 86's western terminus. As SR 191 continues north, it runs along Lake Cathance in Meddybemps. Notably, in Cooper, SR 191 heads due east just below the 45 degree North parallel, possibly due to concerns in the 19th century that the Canada–United States border would be set there, as it is in New York and Vermont. Then SR 191 branches off of SR 214. This is SR 214's western terminus. SR 191 then runs along the Meddybemps Lake. As it enters Baring Plantation, SR 191 has its northern terminus at US 1 and SR 9.

Major junctions

References

External links

Floodgap Roadgap's RoadsAroundME: Maine State Route 191

191
Transportation in Washington County, Maine